Virendra Kataria (20 April 1931 – 5 March 2019) was the  Lieutenant Governor of Puducherry, India.
He was a member of Rajya Sabha from Punjab during his tenure from 5 July 1992 till 4 July 1998. He remained general secretary and was subsequently President of the Indian National Congress in Punjab. He belonged to Abohar, Punjab. He played a vital role in Indian politics and was associated with Indian National Congress throughout his life. He was also local chairman of DAV College of Education, Abohar, Punjab (Under DAV CMC, New Delhi). He died in AIIMS New Delhi on 4 March 2019 at the age of 88.

References

Lieutenant Governors of Puducherry
Indian National Congress politicians
Rajya Sabha members from Punjab, India
1931 births
2019 deaths
Indian National Congress politicians from Punjab, India